Per Oscar Heinrich Oscarsson (28 January 1927 – 31 December 2010) was a Swedish actor. He is best known for his role in the 1966 film Hunger, which earned him a Cannes Film Festival Award for Best Actor.

Early life
Oscarsson was born, along with his twin brother Björn, on 28 January 1927 on Kungsholmen, Stockholm, to parents Einar Oscarsson, an engineer, and Therèse, née Küppers. The twins had two elder siblings. Their mother, who was German, died of cancer in 1933.

Career
Oscarsson was best known for his role as Pontus, a starving writer, in the social realism drama Hunger, based on the Knut Hamsun novel by the same name, a role for which he won the 1966 Bodil, the Guldbagge Award for Best Actor in a Leading Role and the 1966 Cannes Film Festival best actor awards. His most recent film role was as Holger Palmgren, the character Lisbeth Salander's publicly appointed guardian, in the 2009 movies The Girl Who Played with Fire and The Girl Who Kicked the Hornets' Nest, based on Stieg Larsson's famous novels.

Death
A fire started in the house of Per Oscarsson and his wife Kia Östling on the night of 30–31 December 2010. On , a relative found the house burned to the ground with only the foundations and chimney remaining. Oscarsson had not been heard from since the fire. On , the deaths of Oscarsson and his wife were confirmed through dental records by Swedish police. Oscarsson died four weeks before his 84th birthday.

Selected filmography 

Eaglets (1944) - Young Man (uncredited)
Prince Gustaf (1944) - Prince August
Flickor i hamn (1945) - Young Man (uncredited)
 The Serious Game (1945) - Filip Stille, Lydia's Brother (uncredited)
Kristin Commands (1946) - Jan Westman (uncredited)
 Youth in Danger (1946) - Stickan
 The Loveliest Thing on Earth (1947) - Tomas Isakson
 The Street (1949) - Åke Rodelius
 Son of the Sea (1949) - Rolf Bakken
Vi flyr på Rio (1949) - Helmer Wallberg
Living on 'Hope' (1951)- Per
 Encounter with Life (1952) - Robert
Defiance (1952) - Rolf Thörner
Barabbas (1953) - Boy
Vi tre debutera (We Three Debutantes) (1953) - Lillebror Brummer
Karin Månsdotter (1954) - Anders
Wild Birds (1955) - Nisse Bortom
 (Ingen så tokig som jag) (1955) - Oskar Ölander
Fröken April (Miss April) (1958) - Sverker Ek
 Lovely Is the Summer Night (1961) - Lars-Ove Larsson
 Ticket to Paradise (1962) - Freddo Rossi
 (The Doll) (1962) - Lundgren
 (1963) - Hans Treve
 (Adam and Eve) (1963) - Reverend Helge Kall
Någon av er (1963, TV Movie)
 (1964) - Man without character
Bödeln (1965, TV Movie) - Galg-Lasse
Asmodeus (1966, TV Movie) - Blaise Couture
Syskonbädd 1782 (My Sister My Love) (1966) - Jacob / Brother
Doktor Knock (1966, TV Movie)
Hunger (1966) - Pontus
Myten (1966) - Guest
Patrasket (1966, TV Movie) - Joe Meng
ABC Stage 67 (1966, TV Series) - Olaf Helton
Here's Your Life (1966) - Niklas
Trettondagsafton (1967, TV Movie) - Andreas Blek af Nosen
Drottningens juvelsmycke (1967, TV Mini-Series) - Richard Furumo
De Löjliga preciöserna (1967, TV Movie) - Jodelet
Ghosts (1967, TV Movie) - Osvald Alving
Who Saw Him Die? (1968) - Sören Mårtensson
A Dandy in Aspic (1968) - Pavel
Doctor Glas (1968) - Dr. Glas
Vindingevals (1968) - The Baptiser
An-Magritt (1969) - Hedström
 (Between Us, Close to the Wind) (1969) - Per Olofsson
La Madriguera (Honeycomb) (1969) - Pedro
 (1969) - Jonne
Love Is War (1970) - Mann med ønskekvist
The Last Valley (1971) - Father Sebastian
The Night Visitor (1971) - Dr. Anton Jenks
Secrets (1971) - Raoul Kramer
The New Land (1972) - Pastor Törner
Endless Night (1972) - Santonix
 (1973, TV Movie) - August Strindberg
The Blockhouse (1973) - Lund
 (Dream Town, Dream City) (1973) - Florian Sand
The Blue Hotel (1973, TV Movie) - The Swede
 (1973) - Ebon Lundin
Gangsterfilmen (A Stranger Came by Train) (1974) - Johan Gustavsson
 (1976) - Managing Clerk
Dagny (1977) - August Strindberg
Terror of Frankenstein (aka Victor Frankenstein) (1977) - The Monster
Uppdraget (The Assignment) (1977) - Sixto
The Brothers Lionheart (1977) - Orvar
The Adventures of Picasso (1978) - Apollinaire
Chez nous (1978) - Schrenk
Kristoffers hus (Christopher's House) (1979) - Kräftan
Charlotte Löwensköld (1979) - Pontus Friman
Hello Sweden (1979)
 (1980)
 (Outrage) (1980) - Doctor
 (Battle of Sweden, Sweden for the Swedes) (1980) - Gustav Leonard Vinkelhjern Klosterhjerta / Jean Louis VIII / Karl Brecht der Stärkste und der Grösste / Wilfred Himmelthrill XIII
The Sleep of Death (The Inn of the Flying Dragon) (1980) - Col. Gaillard
Montenegro (1981) - Dr. Aram Pazardjian
Kallocain (1981, TV Mini-Series) - Försöksperson nr 135
Göta kanal eller Vem drog ur proppen? (1981) - Ulf Svensson
 (1981, TV Movie) - Georg
 (1982, TV Mini-Series) - Gustav Jörgensson
Historien om lilla och stora kanin (1983, Short) - Narrator (voice)
Master Olof (1983, TV Mini-Series) - Hans Windrank
Henrietta (1983) - Einar
Vargen (1984, TV Movie) - Arnold Wolf
 (1984, TV Mini-Series) - Gustav Jörgensson
Ronia, the Robber's Daughter (1984) - Borka
Da Capo (1985) - Eino
Hud (1986) - The Vicar
 (1986) - With
Bödeln och skökan (1986, TV Movie) - Fogden
 (1986, TV Mini-Series)
 (1987, TV Movie) - The Estate Owner
 (1988, TV Mini-Series) - With
Oväder (1988, TV Movie) - Brodern
 (1988) - Erlandson, Vraket
 (1988, TV Mini-Series) - Gustav Jörgensson
 (1988, TV Mini-Series) - Himself
Ingen rövare finns i skogen (1988, Short) - Fiolito
1939 (1989) - Isak
Kurt Olsson - The Film About My Life as Myself (1990) -  Manager Lindroth
 (1990) - The poet
 (1991, TV Mini-Series) - Larsson
House of Angels (1992) - Erik Zander
Kejsarn av Portugallien (1992–1993, TV Mini-Series) - Ol-Bengtsa
 (1993, TV Mini-Series) - Gustav Jörgensson
Dreaming of Rita (1993) - Bob
Cross My Heart and Hope to Die (1994) - Pianostemmeren
Kan du vissla Johanna? (1994, TV Movie) - Nils
 (TV mini-series) (1996)
Harry och Sonja (1996) - Harry's Father
Juloratoriet (Christmas Oratorio) (1996) - Fälldin
Germans (Jubilee, the Darkest Hour) (1996) - Prof. Sonnenbruch
The Last Viking (1997) - Skrælling
 (1997) - Vilhelm
 (1997, Short) - Dansedommeren
 (1998) - Dansedommer
Stormen (1998, TV Movie) - Gonzalo
White Water Fury (2000) - Åke
 (2000, TV Mini-Series) - Herr von Hancken
 (2001, TV Mini-Series) - Elof
 (Send More Candy) (2001) - Rasmus
Stora teatern (2002, TV Mini-Series) - Berra
Midsommer (Midsummer) (2003) - Persson
 (The Bouncer, The Man Behind the Door) (2003) - Karl
 (2004, TV Movie) - Allan
Young Andersen (Young Andersen) (2005) - H.C. Andersens farfar
Those Who Whisper (2006, TV Movie) - Pappan
The Girl Who Played with Fire (2009) - Holger Palmgren
The Girl Who Kicked the Hornets' Nest (2009) - Holger Palmgren (uncredited)
Tysta leken (2011) - Oscar (final film role)

References

External links 

1927 births
2010 deaths
20th-century male writers
20th-century Swedish male actors
20th-century Swedish writers
21st-century Swedish male actors
Accidental deaths in Sweden
Best Actor Bodil Award winners
Best Actor Guldbagge Award winners
Cannes Film Festival Award for Best Actor winners
Deaths from fire
Identical twin male actors
Male actors from Stockholm
Swedish male screenwriters
Swedish film directors
Swedish film producers
Swedish male film actors
Swedish male television actors
Swedish people of German descent
Swedish screenwriters
Swedish twins